Christian Johnston, known professionally as B.A. Johnston, is a Canadian comedic musician and performance artist based in Hamilton, Ontario.

Career
Johnston was born and grew up in Hamilton, Ontario. He began touring around Canada in 2002, performing songs that are often comedic in nature and include pop cultural references to sports teams, junk food, and video games. Accompanying himself on guitar and keyboard, he performed as the character B.A. (Bored Again) Johnston who lives at home with his mother. By birth, his name is Christian Johnston, but in high school was given the nickname “Bored Again Christian".  It stuck over the years and became his stage name. 

By 2006 Johnston had recorded four albums of original songs, completing a cross-country tour travelling exclusively by Greyhound bus before beginning to tour in an old station wagon or mini-van. Johnston's 2010 album Thank You for Being a Friend appeared on the !Earshot National Top 50 Chart. Since that time he has continued touring extensively across Canada year-round, mainly performing in clubs and bars. In 2014, Noisey compared him to American singer, songwriter GG Allin. His ninth album Shit Sucks was released in 2015 and was a long list nominee for the 2015 Polaris Music Prize. Exclaim! magazine described it as "simplistic synth-pop and aggressive acoustic folk."

In 2017 a collaboration between Johnston and Sawdust City Brewing Company resulted in the launch of Olde B.A. Johnston's Finest Malt Liquor. That year his album Gremlins III, a mixture of folk and punk music, was released through Wyatt Records.  That year a feature article about Johnston in the Globe And Mail acknowledged his polarizing status in the Canadian music scene, noting that for some he is a "modern-age Stompin' Tom Connors." However, unlike Connors, Johnston's references to life in modern-day Canada are exaggeratedly irreverent and unromanticised, featuring ironic swipes at large Canadian institutions like Foodland, No Frills, and Tim Hortons.

As of 2022, Johnston continues to tour across Canada, performing his energetic and humorous show.

Discography
Albums (CD, LP)

In Situation Bad (2003)
Love Letters to the Girls in My High School Art Class (2003)
My Heart Is a Blinking Nintendo (2005)
Call Me When Old and Fat Is the New Young and Sexy (2006)
Stairway to Hamilton (2008)
I Was a Young Man Once (2009)
Thank You for Being a Friend (2010)
Hi Dudes! (2012)
Mission Accomplished (2013)
Shit Sucks (2015)
Gremlins III (2017)
The Skid Is Hot Tonight (2019)
Werewolves of London, Ontario (2022)

Singles, Splits, & EPs

 Songs About a Stewardess (2005)
 B.A. Johnston & The Moby Dicks (2011)
 B.A. Johnston featuring The Magnificent Sevens (2011)
 B.A. Johnston Supreme Quarantine 7” Split w/ The Burning Hell (2020)

References

Musicians from Hamilton, Ontario
Living people
Year of birth missing (living people)
Canadian indie rock musicians